Get Up Sequences Part One is the sixth studio album by English band The Go! Team. It was released on 2 July 2021 through Memphis Industries.

Track listing
All tracks are written by Ian Parton except where noted.

Charts

Reception 
On review aggregator site Metacritic, the album has a score of 71, indicating "generally favorable reviews".

References 

2021 albums
The Go! Team albums